Kyakhta is a town and the administrative center of Kyakhtinsky District in the Republic of Buryatia, Russia, located on the Kyakhta River near the Mongolia–Russia border. The town stands directly opposite the Mongolian border town of Altanbulag. Population:  From 1727 it was the border crossing for the Kyakhta trade between Russia and China.

Etymology
The Buryat name means place covered with couch grass, and is derived from Mongolian word , meaning couch grass.

Geography
The region where Kyakhta stands is advantageous for Russo-Chinese trade. The Siberian River Routes connect the fur-bearing lands of Siberia to Lake Baikal. From there, the Selenga River valley is the natural route through the mountains southeast of Lake Baikal out onto the plains of Mongolia.

History
Kyakhta was founded in 1727 soon after the Treaty of Kyakhta was negotiated just north at Selenginsk. It was the starting point of the boundary markers that defined what is now the northern border of Mongolia. Kyakhta's founder, the Serb Sava Vladislavich, established it as a trading point between Russia and the Qing Empire. The Manchus built Maimaicheng just south of Kyakhta on their side of the border. Before 1762, state caravans traveled from Kyakhta to Peking. After that date, trade was mostly by barter at Kyakhta-Maimaicheng, with merchants crossing the border to make their business.

Kyakhta and Maimaicheng were visited by the famous English adventurer and engineer Samuel Bentham in 1782. He related that he was entertained by the commander of the Chinese city "with the greatest politeness which a stranger can meet with in any country whatever". At that time, the Russians sold furs, textiles, clothing, hides, leather, hardware, and cattle, while the Chinese sold silk, cotton stuffs, teas, fruits, porcelain, rice, candles, rhubarb, ginger, and musk.

Kyakhta was crowded, unclean, ill-planned, and never came to reflect the wealth that flowed through it, although several Neoclassical buildings were erected in the 19th century, including a tea bourse (1842) and the Orthodox cathedral (1807–1817), both of which still stand. In 1996 the Voskreskenskaya church was being used as a stable. It was from Kyakhta that Nikolay Przhevalsky, Grigory Potanin, Pyotr Kozlov, and Vladimir Obruchev set off on their expeditions into the interior of Mongolia and Xinjiang.

Town status was granted to Kyakhta in 1805.

After the entire Russian-Chinese frontier was opened to trade in 1860 and the Trans-Siberian and the Chinese Eastern Railways bypassed it, Kyakhta fell into decline. The town was renamed Troitskosavsk during the first part of the 20th century, but the original name was restored in 1935. Other sources have Troitskosavsk as a fort a short distance north, Troitskosavsk being the administrative and military center while Kyakhta was the trading post on the border.

In the mid-20th century, a branch railway was built from Ulan-Ude (on the Trans-Siberian) to Mongolia's Ulan Bator, and, eventually, to China, paralleling the old Kyakhta trade route. However, this railway crosses the Russian-Mongolian border not in Kyakhta itself, but in nearby Naushki.

Kyakhta Pidgin

As the first market town on the border between the Russian and Chinese Empires, Kyakhta gave its name to the so-called Kyakhta Russian–Chinese Pidgin, a contact language that was used by Russian and Chinese traders to communicate.

Administrative and municipal status
Within the framework of administrative divisions, Kyakhta serves as the administrative center of Kyakhtinsky District. As an administrative division, it is, together with one rural locality (the settlement of Sudzha), incorporated within Kyakhtinsky District as the Town of Kyakhta. As a municipal division, the Town of Kyakhta is incorporated within Kyakhtinsky Municipal District as Kyakhta Urban Settlement.

Economy
Kyakhta's economy today relies mainly on its status as an important center for trade between Russia, China, and Mongolia, located on the highway from the republic's capital of Ulan-Ude to the Mongolian capital of Ulan Bator. It also has textile, lumber, and food-processing plants.

Culture
Kyakhta is home to the Damdin Sükhbaatar memorial museum.

Climate
Kyakhta has a humid continental climate (Köppen climate classification Dwb) with dry, severely cold winters and warm, moist summers.

Town name in other languages
 (Khiagt)
Manchu: Kiyaktu
Chinese: 恰克图 / 恰克圖 (Qiàkètú) or 恰克土 (Qiàkètǔ)
 (Khyaagta)

"South Kyakhta").

References

Notes

Sources

Е. М. Поспелов (Ye. M. Pospelov). "Географические названия мира" (Geographic Names of the World). Moscow, 1998.
Christie, Ian R. (1993). The Benthams in Russia 1780–1791. Oxford, UK; Providence, RI: Berg Publishers Limited. . .

Cities and towns in Buryatia
Populated places in Kyakhtinsky District
Mongolia–Russia border crossings
Populated places established in 1727
1727 establishments in the Russian Empire
Transbaikal Oblast